

Race Results

Race 1; 1955 Southern 100 Junior 350cc Race final standings.
July 1955 Billown Circuit 12 laps – 51 miles (81.13 km)

Race 2; 1955 Southern 100 Lightweight 250cc Race final standings.
July 1955 Billown Circuit 6 laps – 25.50 miles (41.06 km)

Race 3; 1955 Southern 100 Solo Championship 500cc Race final standings.
July 1955 Billown Circuit 24 laps – 102 miles (164.25 km)

Sources

External links

Southern 100
Southern 100 Races
Southern 100 Races